Dorothea Marie of Saxe-Gotha-Altenburg (22 January 1674 – 18 April 1713) was Duchess of Saxe-Meiningen as the first wife of Ernst Ludwig I, Duke of Saxe-Meiningen. She was the daughter of Frederick I, Duke of Saxe-Gotha-Altenburg and his first wife, Magdalena Sybille of Saxe-Weissenfels. She married Ernst Ludwig I on the 19 September 1704.

Issue
Josef Bernhard (b. Meiningen, 27 May 1706 d. Rome, 22 March 1724)
Friedrich August (b. Meiningen, 4 November 1707 d. Meiningen 25 Dec 1707)
Ernst Ludwig II, Duke of Saxe-Meiningen (b. Coburg, 8 August 1709 d. Meiningen, 24 February 1729)
Luise Dorothea (b. Meiningen, 7 December 1710 d. Gotha, 22 October 1771) married on 17 September 1729 to Frederick III, Duke of Saxe-Gotha-Altenburg
Karl Frederick, Duke of Saxe-Meiningen (b. Meiningen, 18 July 1712 d. Meiningen, 28 March 1743).

Ancestry

1674 births
1713 deaths
House of Saxe-Meiningen
House of Saxe-Gotha-Altenburg
People from Gotha (town)
People from Saxe-Gotha-Altenburg
Princesses of Saxe-Gotha-Altenburg
Princesses of Saxe-Meiningen
Duchesses of Saxe-Meiningen
Daughters of monarchs